Carlos Rosa Mayi (born September 21, 1984) is a former professional baseball pitcher.

Career
Rosa began the  season in Double-A with the Northwest Arkansas Naturals, where he led the Texas League in ERA and WHIP. He was promoted to Triple-A Omaha in May. He made his Major League Baseball debut against the Arizona Diamondbacks on June 14, . He also got his first strikeout on that day.

Rosa was traded to the Arizona Diamondbacks on May 1, 2010 for minor league shortstop Rey Navarro.

On April 17, 2016, Rosa signed with the Guerreros de Oaxaca of the Mexican Baseball League. He was released on April 28, 2016.

External links

1984 births
Arizona Diamondbacks players
Arizona League Royals players
Burlington Bees players
Chiba Lotte Marines players
Dominican Republic expatriate baseball players in Japan
Dominican Republic expatriate baseball players in the United States
Gulf Coast Royals players
High Desert Mavericks players
Kansas City Royals players

Living people
Major League Baseball pitchers
Major League Baseball players from the Dominican Republic
Northwest Arkansas Naturals players
Omaha Royals players
Reno Aces players
Wichita Wranglers players
Wilmington Blue Rocks players